Caroline Emma Stanley, Countess of Derby (née Neville; born 28 December 1963) is an English socialite and peeress.

Early life 
Caroline Emma Neville was born on 28 December 1963 to Robin Neville, a member of the House of Neville, and Robin Helen Brockhoff. Her paternal grandfather was Henry Seymour Neville, 9th Baron Braybrooke. 

In 1990 her father succeeded his father as the 10th Baron Braybrooke, at which time she was styled as The Honourable Caroline Neville. She was known for being a socialite in the 1990s and was dubbed the "Posh Essex Girl" by the press.

Prior to her marriage, she worked as an assistant to the Curator of the Royal Collection. She now runs the Derby family's stately home and competes in dressage.

Marriage and issue 
In 1994 it was reported in tabloids that she was dating Prince Andrew, but her engagement to Edward Stanley, 19th Earl of Derby was announced later that year. On 21 October 1995 she married Lord Derby at the Church of St. Mary the Virgin in Saffron Walden, Essex. Upon her marriage she became the Countess of Derby. They have three children:
 Lady Henrietta Mary Rose Stanley (b. 6 February 1997)
 Edward John Robin Stanley, Lord Stanley (b. 21 April 1998)
 The Honourable Oliver Henry Hugh Stanley (b. 26 April 2002)

The family seat is at Knowsley Hall, Merseyside.

References 

Living people
1963 births
Daughters of barons
Derby
English socialites
Neville family
Stanley family